La Scie  Air Station (ADC ID: N-26B) was a General Surveillance Gap Filler Radar station in the Canadian province of Newfoundland and Labrador, It was located  east-northeast of  St.John's, Near La Scie.  It was closed in 1961.

History
The site was established in 1957 as a manned Gap Filler radar station, built by the United States Air Force, under operational control of Saint Anthony Air Station and part of Pinetree Line of Ground-Control Intercept (GCI) radar sites.

The station was assigned to Aerospace Defense Command in 1957, and was given designation "N-26B" (later C-26B). Aerospace Defense Command stationed the 642d Aircraft Control and Warning Squadron at the station in 1957.  It operated an AN/FPS-14 manned Gap Filler search radar.

As a manned Gap Filler base, the 921st's role was to guide interceptor aircraft toward unidentified intruders picked up on the unit's radar scopes. These interceptors were assigned to the 64th Air Division at Goose AFB, Labrador.

USAF units and assignments 
Units:
 921st Aircraft Control and Warning Squadron, 
 Assigned to Air Defense Command, 1 April 1957
 Discontinued 1961

Assignments:
 4731st Air Defense Group, 1 April 1957
 Goose Air Defense Sector, 6 June 1960

See also
 List of USAF Aerospace Defense Command General Surveillance Radar Stations

References

  A Handbook of Aerospace Defense Organization 1946 - 1980,  by Lloyd H. Cornett and Mildred W. Johnson, Office of History, Aerospace Defense Center, Peterson Air Force Base, Colorado
 Winkler, David F. (1997), Searching the skies: the legacy of the United States Cold War defense radar program. Prepared for United States Air Force Headquarters Air Combat Command.

Radar stations of the United States Air Force
Aerospace Defense Command military installations
Installations of the United States Air Force in Canada
Military installations in Newfoundland and Labrador
Military installations established in 1957
Military installations closed in 1961
1957 establishments in Newfoundland and Labrador
1961 disestablishments in Newfoundland and Labrador